Hamble Club Football Club is a football club based in Hamble-le-Rice, Hampshire.

History
The club was established in 1969, originally as a youth team. They later became members of the Southampton Saturday League, where they played until joining Division Three of the Hampshire League in 1993. The club were Division Three champions in 1996–97, earning promotion to Division Two. In 2004 the Hampshire League merged into the Wessex League, with Hamble becoming members of the new Division Three. In 2006 the division was renamed Division Two, but at the end of the 2006–07 the division was disbanded and the club became founder members of the Hampshire Premier League.

Hamble pulled out of the Hampshire Premier League during the 2012–13 season. Although they were readmitted the following season, they started in the newly formed second tier of the league, Division One. The club were Division One runners-up in 2013–14 and were promoted to the Senior Division and went on to win the Senior Division in 2014–15. After finishing third the following season they were promoted to Division One of the Wessex League. The club were Division One champions in 2016–17, earning promotion to the Premier Division.

Ground
The club play their games at the Abbey. The ground used to be known as the Shell Mex Ground.

Honours
Wessex League
Division One champions 2016–17
Hampshire League
Division Three champions 1996–97
Hampshire Premier League
Senior Division champions 2014–15

Records
Best FA Cup performance: Preliminary round, 2018–19
Best FA Vase performance: Fifth round, 2017–18

References

External links

Football clubs in England
Football clubs in Hampshire
1969 establishments in England
Association football clubs established in 1969
Southampton Saturday Football League
Hampshire League
Hampshire Premier League
Wessex Football League